Thomas Marshall Miller (May 22, 1918 – December 2, 2005) was an American football end in the National Football League for the Philadelphia Eagles, the Washington Redskins, and the Green Bay Packers.  Miller also played for the Steagles, a team that was created when the Philadelphia Eagles and Pittsburgh Steelers merged in 1943 due to the lack of players (most were fighting in World War II).  He attended Hampden–Sydney College. Miller was inducted into the Green Bay Packers Hall of Fame in 1999 for his work as an executive and general manager for the team.

References

1918 births
2005 deaths
People from Northumberland County, Pennsylvania
Players of American football from Pennsylvania
American football wide receivers
Hampden–Sydney Tigers football players
Philadelphia Eagles players
Steagles players and personnel
Washington Redskins players
Green Bay Packers general managers
Green Bay Packers players